Antigua and Barbuda competed at the 2011 Pan American Games in Guadalajara, Mexico from October 14 through October 30, 2011. The Chef de Mission of the team was Daryll S Matthew. Antigua and Barbuda's final team consisted of seven athletes in three sports.

Athletics

Antigua and Barbuda sent three athletes. Their top sprinter and defending Pan American Games champion Daniel Bailey withdrew due to injury.

Men

Women

Cycling

Road 
Antigua and Barbuda qualified one male cyclist in road cycling. Antigua and Barbuda also received a wildcard to send another female cyclist.

Men

Women

Swimming 

Antigua and Barbuda sent two swimmers.

Men

Women

References

Nations at the 2011 Pan American Games
P
2011